Nenad Trpovski (born September 15, 1978) is a Macedonian slalom canoer who competed in the mid-1990s. He finished 30th in the C-1 event at the 1996 Summer Olympics in Atlanta.

References
Sports-Reference.com profile

1978 births
Canoeists at the 1996 Summer Olympics
Living people
Macedonian male canoeists
Olympic canoeists of North Macedonia
Place of birth missing (living people)